Jo Zwaan (11 November 1922 – 5 February 2012) was a Dutch sprinter. He competed in the Men's 100 m and 4 × 100 m relay events at the 1948 Summer Olympics. Two years earlier he had already been present at the 1946 European Athletics Championships as part of the Dutch 4 × 100 m relay team, that finished in 4th position in 42.3 seconds.

His brother Jan was also an Olympic sprinter; he participated in the 110 m hurdles event at the 1948 Games.

References

External links
 

1922 births
2012 deaths
Dutch male sprinters
Athletes (track and field) at the 1948 Summer Olympics
Olympic athletes of the Netherlands
Athletes from Amsterdam